NGC 3953 is a barred spiral galaxy located in the constellation Ursa Major. The galaxy is known to exhibit an inner ring structure that encircles the bar. 
NGC 3953 is a member of the M109 Group, a large group of galaxies located within the constellation Ursa Major that may contain over 50 galaxies.

Two supernovae have been identified within NGC 3953: the type Ia supernova SN 2001dp and SN 2006bp.

References

External links

 Spiral Galaxy NGC 3953 – Supernova 2001 dp
 SEDS: Spiral Galaxy NGC 3953

Barred spiral galaxies
M109 Group
Ursa Major (constellation)
3953
06870
037306
Astronomical objects discovered in 1781